The 2014–15 Maritime Junior Hockey League season was the 48th season in league history. The season consisted of 48 games played by each MHL team.

At the end of the regular season, the Dieppe Commandos, Woodstock Slammers, Miramichi Timberwolves, Campbellton Tigers, Pictou County Crushers, Truro Bearcats, Valley Wildcats and Yarmouth Mariners  competed for the Kent Cup, the league's playoff championship trophy.  The Kent Cup was won by the Dieppe Commandos. They beat the Truro Bearcats 4 games to 0 for their first championship in 20 Years.

The Commandos met with the Longueuil Collège Français (QJHL Champions), the Carleton Place Canadians (CCHL Champions) and the Cornwall Colts (Host) in Cornwall, Ontario to determine the Eastern Canadian Fred Page Cup champion. The champion ended up being the Carleton Place Canadians as they defeated the Commandos 3-2 in the championship game to win their second straight title.

Team Changes
County Aces joined league and began playing this season.

The Valley Wildcats relocated from Kentville to Berwick.

The Bridgewater Lumberjacks were renamed the South Shore Lumberjacks. (Mid Season)

Regular Season Standings 
Note: GP = Games played; W = Wins; L = Losses; OTL = Overtime losses; SL = Shootout losses; GF = Goals for; GA = Goals against; PTS = Points; STK = Streak; x = Clinched playoff spot; y = Clinched division; z = Clinched first overall

Final Standings

2015 MHL Playoff bracket

Quarter-finals

Notes; *= If Necessary

Eastlink Semi-final 1 (1) Pictou County Crushers  vs. (4) Truro Bearcats

Eastlink Semi-final 2 (2) Yarmouth Mariners  vs. (3) Valley Wildcats

Roger Meek Semi-final 1 (1) Dieppe Commandos vs. (4) Campbellton Tigers

Roger Meek Semi-final 2 (2) Woodstock Slammers vs. (3) Miramichi Timberwolves

Semi-finals

Eastlink Division Final (3) Valley Wildcats vs. (4) Truro Bearcats

Roger Meek Final (1) Dieppe Commandos vs. (3) Miramichi Timberwolves

Kent Cup final

Kent Cup final (1M) Dieppe Commandos vs. (4E) Truro Bearcats

Fred Page Cup Championship
Hosted by the Cornwall Colts in Cornwall, Ontario

Fred Page Cup Tournament

Round robin
Key; x = Clinched championship round berth; y = Clinched first overall

Dieppe Commandos Schedule & Results

Awards
All Star Team
Allstar Goaltender - Blade Mann-Dixon - Valley Wildcats
Allstar Forwards - Thomas Stavert - Summerside Western Capitals, Robbie Graham - Dieppe Commandos, Connor Donaghey - Yarmouth Mariners
Allstar Defense - Jordan McNaughton - Truro Bearcats, Keaton Lubin - Woodstock Slammers
Individual Awards
Player of the Year - Robbie Graham – Dieppe Commandos
Defense of the Year - Jordan McNaughton – Truro Bearcats
Goalie of the Year - Will King – Campbellton Tigers 
Rookie of the Year - Curtis Hastings – County Aces
Top Scorer - Robbie Graham – Dieppe Commandos
Top Goal-tending Duo - Matt Jenkins and Antoine Landry – Woodstock Slammers
 Community Leadership Award - 
Character Award - Robert Pelletier – Campbellton Tigers 
Playoff MVP - Robbie Graham - Dieppe Commandos
Coach of the Year - Nick Greenough - Valley Wildcats
GM of the Year - 
Moe Bent Builders Award -
Team Awards
Eastlink Division regular season champions - Pictou County Crushers 
Meek Division regular season champions - Dieppe Commandos 
MHL President's Trophy winners - Dieppe Commandos 
Eastlink Division playoff champions - Truro Bearcats 
Meek Division playoff champions - Dieppe Commandos 
Kent Cup Champions - Dieppe Commandos

External links 
 Official website of the Maritime Junior Hockey League
 Official website of the Canadian Junior Hockey League

MHL
Maritime Junior Hockey League seasons